Payao, officially the Municipality of Payao (Chavacano: Municipalidad de Payao), is a 3rd class municipality in the province of Zamboanga Sibugay, Philippines. According to the 2020 census, it has a population of 34,952 people.

Geography

Barangays
Payao is politically subdivided into 29 barangays.

Climate

Demographics

Economy

References

External links
 Payao Profile at PhilAtlas.com
 [ Philippine Standard Geographic Code]
Philippine Census Information

Municipalities of Zamboanga Sibugay